Sikandarpur Karan is a village and corresponding community development block in Unnao district of Uttar Pradesh, India. It is connected to state highways, has five primary schools and no healthcare facilities, and hosts a daily market. As of 2011, its population is 4,548, in 836 households.

Villages 
Sikandarpur Karan CD block has the following 117 villages:

References

Villages in Unnao district
Community development blocks in India